The Chandrapur–Padghe HVDC transmission system is an HVDC connection between Chandrapur and Padghe (near Mumbai) in the state of Maharashtra in India, which was put into service in 1999.

It connects the coal-fired Chandrapur Super Thermal Power Station to the major load centre of Mumbai. The transmission voltage is ±500 kV and the maximum transmission power is 1,500 megawatts. The scheme uses thyristor valves, arranged in a single twelve pulse bridge per pole. The project was built by ABB and BHEL, and is owned by Maharashtra State Electricity Board (MSEB).

The close proximity of the two converter stations meant that the control systems needed to be carefully coordinated, a task made more challenging by the fact that the two stations were built by different manufacturers. To address this problem a series of joint simulation studies, involving the control equipment from both converter stations connected to a common simulator, was performed.

Sites

See also
High-voltage direct current
Chandrapur back to back HVDC converter station

References

External links 

 MSEB website
  ABB Group Website

1999 establishments in Maharashtra
HVDC transmission lines
Electric power transmission infrastructure in India
Energy in Maharashtra
Energy infrastructure completed in 1999
20th-century architecture in India